The Sony α7S III (model ILCE-7SM3) is a 12.2-megapixel full-frame mirrorless interchangeable-lens camera made by Sony. The α7S III is offered as a body only.

Features

 New 12MP Exmor R BSI CMOS sensor 
 9.44 million-dot viewfinder (2048 x 1536 pixels) (3.15MP) (QXGA) 
Can record FHD@240fps, 4K@120fps 10bit 4:2:2 and 4K@120fps Raw over HDMI (up to 16-bit 4.2K (4264 x 2408) 60fps) 
Dual Gain (ISO) modes for cleaner low-light recording
 5-axis in body image stabilization
 LCD touchscreen (3 inch/7.5 cm) fully articulated
 Multi Interface Shoe (alongside k3m xlr adapter and new microphones using direct digital signal)
 4th Revision body with improved cooling, weather sealing and better overall handling (one-layer disassembly for replacement of audio ports) 
 Dual function memory card slots, for both SDXC UHS-II & high speed CFexpress type A

Image features
The α7S III features a 35mm (35.6 x 23.8 mm) full-frame Exmor CMOS sensor capable of capturing approximately 12.2 effective megapixels.

Autofocus and metering
The camera's 759-point autofocus sensor uses mainly phase-detection but also 425 points contrast-detection AF to capture and record alongside subject tracking with high accuracy

ISO
For still images, the α7S III's ISO is 100–102400 with expansion down to ISO 50 and up to ISO 409600 equivalent. For movies, the α7S III's ISO is 100-102400 equivalent with expansion down to ISO 100 and up to ISO 409600 equivalent. For still images or movies on auto setting, the camera's ISO is 100–12800 with selectable lower and upper limits. The cameras native ISO is 12800 for photos and non s-log video

Shutter
The α7S III's shutter speed range is 30 s to 1/8,000 s for still images. For bulb movies, the shutter speed range is 1/4 s (1/3 s step) to 1/8,000 s.

The camera has an approximate maximum continuous shooting speed of 10.0 frames per second in Speedy Priority Continuous shooting drive and Continuous shooting drive mode.

Ergonomics and functions
The α7S III has a TFT LCD screen with a size of 7.5 cm (3 inches) and resolution of 1,440,000 dots (800 x 600 pixels) (SVGA) with an adjustable tilt angle of 107 degrees up and 41 degrees down (approximate). The OLED electronic viewfinder has a resolution of 9,437,184 dots (2048 x 1536 pixels) (3.15MP) (QXGA) and a .90x magnification.

The camera additionally has built-in Wi-Fi with NFC compatibility.

Video
The camera can record 4K UHD (QFHD: 3840 x 2160) internally in full frame format at 120 FPS. The camera allows for movie image size to  be set, as well as the frame rate per second, and compression method. The camera can shoot in HLG and S-log internally.

Accessories
The α7S III camera body comes with the following:
 Battery Pack NP-FZ100 (rechargeable)
 Battery Charger BC-QZ1

See also
List of Sony E-mount cameras
Sony α7SII
Sony FX3

References

External links

 Product page

α7S III
Cameras introduced in 2020
Full-frame mirrorless interchangeable lens cameras
Personal cameras and photography in space